Crocus minimus is a species of flowering plant in the genus Crocus of the family Iridaceae, found in South Corsica, Sardinia and Capraia.

Flowering occurs from January to April, and the species is found inhabiting scrub areas with low, multi-stemmed woody vegetation that is young or stunted.

References

minimus
Plants described in 1804